New Skin is the debut studio album written and conducted by alternative pop singer and songwriter JONES. It was released on 7 October 2016 through 37 Adventures Records as the succeeding project to her debut extended play, entitled Indulge. The lead single from the album, entitled "Indulge", was released as a digital download on 17 April 2015 as her debut single. It was done so through her debut extended play which was released on the same day. The song gave her instant success on popular digital streaming platforms Spotify and SoundCloud and was considered as one of the biggest breakthrough internet successes. It was then released officially onto YouTube on 17 October 2015.

Not long after the release of the song, her second single "Hoops" was released days after on 30 October 2015. The song was her first ever song outside of her debut extended play and, therefore, sparked much interest about JONES conducting her debut studio album. After a few months into mid-2016, she released her third single "Melt". The album's first promotional single, entitled "Wild", was released on 16 September 2016 as a digital stream.

Upon release, the album was revealed to have been produced by big names, such as Rodaidh McDonald, Two Inch Punch and Tourist, who have been renowned for creating breakthrough hits for Sam Smith and Låpsley. It also gained recognition from big musicians and singers in the music industry, such as MNEK.

Track listing

Charts

References

2016 debut albums
Jones (singer) albums
Albums produced by Ollie Green (producer)